The 2007 PetroSun Independence Bowl, part of the 2007–08 NCAA football bowl season, took place on December 30, 2007 at Independence Stadium in Shreveport, Louisiana. The competing teams were the Alabama Crimson Tide, representing the Southeastern Conference, and the Colorado Buffaloes, from the Big 12 Conference. Alabama won the game, 30–24.

This was the only 2007–08 bowl game in which both teams finished 6–6 on the regular season. It was also the first bowl game for both respective head coaches (Nick Saban and Dan Hawkins) at their current programs.

Game summary
Alabama played Colorado in the Independence Bowl on December 30, 2007. Alabama scored on their opening drive on a 41-yard Leigh Tiffin field goal to lead 3–0. Colorado's first offensive play of the game resulted in an interception by Rolando McClain. Once again, Alabama relied on another field goal from Tiffin to push their lead to 6–0. Later in the quarter, John Parker Wilson threw touchdown strikes of 15-yards to Keith Brown and 34-yards to Matt Caddell to extend the Crimson Tide lead to 20–0 after one quarter.

Early in the second quarter, Wilson connected with Nikita Stover on a 31-yard touchdown pass and the Crimson Tide lead 27–0. The Buffaloes controlled the majority of the second quarter after Wilson threw an interception to Ryan Walters with just under six minutes remaining in the half. Colorado cut the Alabama lead to 27–14 at the half on a pair of Cody Hawkins touchdown passes. The first was a four-yard pass to Tyson DeVree and the second a 25-yard pass to Dusty Sprague.

The only score in the third quarter would come from Kevin Eberhart on a 39-yard Colorado field goal. Tiffin kicked a field goal as the Crimson Tide lead 30–17 with just over four minutes remaining in the game. Colorado responded on the following drive with a 14-yard Hawkins touchdown pass to DeVree to cut the Alabama lead to 30–24 with 3:51 remaining in the game. Alabama was able to run the clock down, and after receiving the 49-yard P.J. Fitzgerald punt, only 0:01 remained in the game. On the final play of the game, Colorado attempted several lateral passes but would fall short of midfield. The 30–24 victory sent Alabama to a 7–6 overall record as they avoided a second consecutive losing season.

Notes

References

2007–08 NCAA football bowl games
2007
2007
2007
December 2007 sports events in the United States
2007 in sports in Louisiana